Fort Colvin, also known as Covill's Fort and Colvin House, is a historic home located near Winchester, Frederick County, Virginia. It was built about 1750, and is a 1 1/2-story, stone and frame building with a metal gable roof and interior chimney.  It measures 24 feet by 34 feet and is nearly centrally positioned over a spring. Also on the property are a contributing site of a small domestic outbuilding and the ruins of a small footbridge. Fort Colvin is believed to have been built by some of the first European settlers in the first multi-ethnic community west of the Blue Ridge Mountains in Virginia.  It is thought to have been used as a settler's fort by Joseph Colvill in 1755.

It was listed on the National Register of Historic Places in 2007.

References

Colvin
Government buildings completed in 1750
Buildings and structures in Frederick County, Virginia
National Register of Historic Places in Frederick County, Virginia
Colvin